André Valmy (8 October 1919 – 18 November 2015) was a French film actor. He was born André Antoine Marius Dugenet in the 14th arrondissement of Paris. He appeared in more than 60 films between 1940 and 2001. He is also known in France to be the dubbed voice of Walter Matthau, Robert Shaw and George Kennedy.

Selected filmography

 Après Mein Kampf mes crimes (1940) - Ernst
 Mademoiselle Béatrice (1943) - (uncredited)
 I Am with You (1943) - Le gérant de l'hôtel
 L'aventure est au coin de la rue (1944) - Etienne
 Le jugement dernier (1945)
 Les démons de l'aube (1946) - Serge Duhamel
 Nuit sans fin (1947) - Olivier
 Le beau voyage (1947)
 Le cavalier de Croix-Mort (1948) - Coco-Latour
 Carrefour du crime (1948) - Jacques Marchand
 Une si jolie petite plage (1949) - Georges
 Manon (1949) - Lieutenant Besnard / Bandit Chief
 Marlene (1949) - Laurin
 Mission in Tangier (1949) - Beaudoit
 Les eaux troubles (1949) - Rudan
 Millionaires for One Day (1949) - Marcel
 L'auberge du péché (1949) - Pierre Goulet
 A Man Walks in the City (1950) - Le commissaire
 Fusillé à l'aube (1950) - Inspecteur Braun
 Under the Sky of Paris (1951) - Le docteur Lucien Evrard
 Rue des Saussaies (1951) - Le commissaire Didier
 Le vrai coupable (1951) - Inspecteur Dumont
 The Cape of Hope (1951) - Sem
 The Smugglers' Banquet (1952) - Le douanier Louis
 We Are All Murderers (1952) - P'tit Louis
 Monsieur Taxi (1952) - L'inspecteur principal
 La Putain respectueuse (1952) - Georges - le patron du club
 Il est minuit, docteur Schweitzer (1952) - L'administrateur Leblanc
 Les Compagnes de la nuit (1953) - Inspecteur Maréchal
 Tempest in the Flesh (1954) - Le psychiatre de l'hôpital Ste Anne
 Before the Deluge (1954) - L'autre inspecteur de police
 Quay of Blondes (1954) - Marco
 The Secret of Helene Marimon (1954) - Thierry
 One Bullet Is Enough (1954) - Stauner
 Black Dossier (1955) - Inspecteur Carlier
 Madelon (1955) - Le capitaine Van Meulen
 If All the Guys in the World (1956) - Le capitaine Pierre Le Guellec
 I'll Get Back to Kandara (1956) - Rudeau
 OSS 117 Is Not Dead (1957) - Joseph Sliven
 Maigret Sets a Trap (1958) - L' inspecteur Lucas
 Incognito (1958) - L'inspecteur Laroche
 The Mask of the Gorilla (1958) - Mauricet
 Ça n'arrive qu'aux vivants (1959)
 Minute papillon (1959) - L'inspecteur Grégoire
 Le Saint mène la danse (1960) - Le policier
 La parole est au témoin (1963) - (voice)
 Coplan Takes Risks (1964) - Pelletier
 Nick Carter va tout casser (1964) - Inspecteur Daumale
 The Sleeping Car Murders (1965) - Un inspecteur
 Tintin and the Temple of the Sun (1969) - Bergamotte (voice)
 The Glorious Musketeers (1974) - Rochefort (voice)

References

External links

 Obituary - Le Figaro 

1919 births
2015 deaths
French male film actors
Male actors from Paris